Julie Shah (née Arnold) is an Associate Professor of Aeronautics and Astronautics at the Massachusetts Institute of Technology and director of the Interactive Robotics Group at the MIT Computer Science and Artificial Intelligence Laboratory.

Early life and education
Shah was born and raised in New Jersey where she attended a small New Jersey charter school with her future husband Neel Shah. She attended Massachusetts Institute of Technology (MIT) for her Bachelor of Science, Master's degree and PhD.

Career
Upon completing her doctoral degree, Shah was immediately offered an assistant professor position in MIT’s Department of Aeronautics and Astronautics (AeroAstro). Prior to accepting the role, she was encouraged to spend an academic year away from MIT as a postdoctoral fellow with Boeing Research and Technology in Seattle to develop real-world applications. In her first year as an assistant professor, Shah co-taught a course called Real Time Systems and Software and co-founded the Interactive Robotics Group at MIT Computer Science and Artificial Intelligence Laboratory (CSAIL). By 2014, Shah collaborated with graduate student Been Kim and associate professor of statistics Cynthia Rudin to augment unsupervised machine learning in computers. As a result of her efforts, she was recognized by the MIT Technology Review TR35 list as one of the world’s top innovators under the age of 35.

During her time at MIT, Shah continued her research on human-robot collaboration and transition of results to real world applications. As a result, she became a 2016–17 Perrin Moorhead Grayson and Bruns Grayson Fellow at Harvard University's Radcliffe Institute for Advanced Study. Upon returning to MIT, Shah earned the 2018 Early Academic Career Award in Robotics and Automation from the IEEE Robotics and Automation Society. In 2019, she received tenure from the Massachusetts Institute of Technology School of Engineering as their Boeing Career Development Professor in the Department of Aeronautics and Astronautics.

References

Notes

External links 

Living people
American aerospace engineers
American women academics
American women engineers
MIT School of Engineering faculty
21st-century women engineers
1982 births
21st-century American women